Gordon Irving Kaye (7 April 194123 January 2017), known professionally as Gorden Kaye, was an English actor, best known for playing womanising café owner René Artois in the television comedy series 'Allo 'Allo!.

Early life
Kaye was born on 7 April 1941 in Huddersfield, West Riding of Yorkshire, the only child of Harold and Gracie Kaye; Gracie was 42 when she gave birth. Harold Kaye was a lorry driver in the ARP during the Second World War, and at other times worked as an engineer in a tractor factory.

When young, Kaye played rugby league for Moldgreen ARLFC before studying at King James's Grammar School, Almondbury, Huddersfield. He worked in hospital radio in Huddersfield (interviewing Ken Dodd and then the Beatles in 1963 when they played the Ritz in the town), and worked in textile mills, a wine factory, and a tractor factory.

Career

Kaye had appeared in a radio play directed by Alan Ayckbourn and also in a television play from Manchester. Ayckbourn suggested that he audition for the Bolton Octagon Theatre; he was offered a contract and his roles there included Pishchik in The Cherry Orchard followed by roles in The Homecoming, The Imaginary Invalid, Luther, and a double-bill of Oedipus and Cyclops.

He made his TV debut as a railway guard in the BBC's Yorkshire mill drama Champion House (1968) and played small roles in such films as The Party's Over (1965), starring Oliver Reed. Having been seen by Pat Phoenix in Little Malcolm by David Halliwell at Bolton, he was cast as Bernard Butler, the nephew of Elsie Tanner (Phoenix), in the soap opera Coronation Street in 1969. He later made an impression on producer/writer David Croft following guest roles in It Ain't Half Hot Mum and Come Back Mrs. Noah.

He appeared in the 1978 comedy short The Waterloo Bridge Handicap, starring Leonard Rossiter, and featured as Dines in the feature film version of Porridge (1979) alongside Ronnie Barker. He also appeared in the drama series All Creatures Great and Small and in the private detective series Shoestring. In 1981, Kaye appeared as Frank Broadhurst in the children's drama serial Codename Icarus.

Kaye appeared in three episodes of Croft's British department store sitcom Are You Being Served? and was later offered the lead role in a series he had written called Oh Happy Band!, but Kaye was unavailable and the part went to Harry Worth. Oh Happy Band! lasted one series.

Kaye had a small part in Terry Gilliam's film Brazil as desk clerk M.O.I. Lobby Porter and appeared in Gilliam's 1977 film Jabberwocky as Sister Jessica.

He played Dr Grant in a television adaptation of Mansfield Park and Lymoges, Duke of Austria in the 1984 BBC production of King John by Shakespeare. He also toured in the National Theatre production of As You Like It, as Touchstone. The same year, he appeared as hard man Sammy, an enforcer employed by agoraphobic bookmaker Albert Wendle in the Minder episode "Get Daley!"

In 1990, Kaye played the fictional local television presenter Maynard Lavery in an edition of Last of the Summer Wine.
In the early 1990s he made a guest appearance in a Christmas special of Family Fortunes, in which he served as team captain and placed host Les Dennis on a special "Double Big Money" round for Dennis to score more than one hundred points to double the charity prize money, which he did. In 1995 Kaye played Monsieur Pamplemousse in a BBC Radio three-part adaption of Michael Bond's 1990 novel Monsieur Pamplemousse Investigates.

===Allo 'Allo!===
In 1982, David Croft sent Kaye the script for the pilot episode of 'Allo 'Allo! inviting him to play the central character of René Artois. He accepted and appeared in all 84 episodes (the main series ran from 1984, two years after the pilot, until 1992) and 1,200 performances of the stage version.

Kaye was the subject of This Is Your Life in 1986 when he was surprised by Eamonn Andrews at the curtain call of the West End stage version of '''Allo 'Allo! at the Prince of Wales Theatre.

Kaye returned as René Artois in a 2007 one-off television revival of Allo 'Allo! and in a stage show in Brisbane, Australia, at the Twelfth Night Theatre in June and July, alongside Sue Hodge as Mimi Labonq and Guy Siner as Lieutenant Gruber. The other characters were portrayed by Australian actors, including Katy Manning, Steven Tandy, Chloe Dallimore, and Jason Gann.

Personal life
Kaye's autobiography, René and Me: An Autobiography (co-written with Hilary Bonner), was published in 1989. In the book, he described his experiences as a shy, gay, overweight, typecast youth. The unusual spelling of his name (usually spelt "Gordon") was the result of a British Actors' Equity Association typing error.

Kaye suffered serious head injuries in a car accident whilst driving his Honda CRX, during the Burns' Day Storm on 25 January 1990. Although he could not remember any details of the incident, he retained a scar on his forehead from a piece of wooden advertising hoarding that had smashed through the car windscreen. Writing in his memoirs, 'Allo 'Allo! co-writer Jeremy Lloyd said he visited Kaye in hospital, adding, "I believe part of his recovery was due to his agent getting a video and showing reruns of '''Allo 'Allo! to remind him who he was." While recovering in hospital from emergency brain surgery to treat injuries sustained in the accident, Kaye was photographed and interviewed by two Sunday Sport journalists, Gary Thompson and Ray Levine. On Kaye's behalf, his agent Peter Froggatt, sued the newspaper, but the Court of Appeal held, in Kaye v Robertson, that there was no remedy in English law for an invasion of privacy.

Death
Kaye suffered from dementia and spent the last two years of his life in a care home in Knaresborough, where he died, on 23 January 2017, at the age of 75. His funeral was held at Huddersfield Parish Church on 17 February. His co-stars from 'Allo 'Allo! Vicki Michelle, Sue Hodge and Kim Hartman attended, as did Ken Morley, also from Coronation Street, who gave a tribute. The unofficial Yorkshire anthem "On Ilkla Moor Baht 'at" was sung at the service.

Filmography

Books
René and Me: An Autobiography, co-written with Hilary Bonner, Sidgwick & Jackson, September 1989,

References

External links
 
 Gorden Kaye at bfi.com
 

1941 births
2017 deaths
People educated at King James's School, Almondbury
Male actors from Huddersfield
20th-century English male actors
Male actors from Yorkshire
English male stage actors
English male soap opera actors
English gay actors
English gay musicians
Gay comedians
British male comedy actors
People involved in road accidents or incidents
20th-century LGBT people
21st-century LGBT people
British LGBT comedians